"Cheatin'" is a song written by Brett James and Don Schlitz and recorded by American country music artist Sara Evans. It was released in October 2005 as the second single from Evans’ 2005 album Real Fine Place. The song peaked at number 9 on the US Billboard Hot Country Songs chart in early 2006. The song was later included on Evans' Greatest Hits album.

Content
This moderate-tempo song is about a woman who is angry about her husband cheating on her. The song talks about all the problems that the husband faces for leaving his wife for his mistress, including living in a trailer park and driving an old beat-up car. The mistress then leaves him, after spending all of his money.

Music video
The music video, directed by Peter Zavadil, shows scenes of the ex-husband sitting in his trailer and working at a bowling alley, very unhappy with his new lifestyle. It is implied through the lyrics that Evans ended up with nearly all of his possessions after the divorce. He eventually turns to gambling and crime after falling deep into debt, resulting in his eviction from the trailer. Evans appears regularly in the music video performing with a microphone inside and outside the trailer.

Chart performance

Year-end charts

References

2005 singles
2005 songs
Songs about infidelity
Music videos directed by Peter Zavadil
RCA Records Nashville singles
Sara Evans songs
Song recordings produced by Mark Bright (record producer)
Songs written by Brett James
Songs written by Don Schlitz